Sports Team is an English alternative rock band based in London. The band consists of lead vocalist Alex Rice, rhythm guitarist and vocalist Rob Knaggs, lead guitarist Henry Young, bassist Oli Dewdney, drummer Al Greenwood, and keyboardist Ben Mack. According to The Guardian, their songs "romanticise Middle England" and idiosyncrasies like Wetherspoons, flip phones, the M5, and fishing.

Background 
The group met whilst studying at the University of Cambridge, aside from Dewdney, who studied at the University of Bristol. The band performed in their early days at the Portland Arms, a pub in the north of Cambridge. The band's members continued to work their day jobs until they became better known. Henry Young was a sports reporter for CNN.

Releases 
Their debut EP Winter Nets was released in January 2018 on Nice Swan Records, and their sophomore EP Keep Walking! was released in 2019.

Their debut album Deep Down Happy was released on 5 June 2020 on Island Records and Bright Antenna Records. The lead single Here's The Thing was released on 17 February 2020. The album received four out of five stars from NME, and was nominated for the Mercury Prize in 2020.

On 28 March 2022 the band announced their second album, Gulp!, alongside lead single "R Entertainment". Gulp was released on 23 September 2022, and received four out of five stars from NME.

Reception 
After releasing their debut EP Winter Nets, the band performed a show in September  2018 at Scala in London, which the band's lyricist Knaggs described as when the group started "being in a band nearly every single day".

Following the Scala show, the band went on to play at both Electric Ballroom and O2 Forum Kentish Town in 2019 with sell-out shows. The band's preference for surprise shows at venues like The Nag's Head in Camberwell led to DIY describing the shows as harking "back to the heady days of The Libertines".

Style 
The band have been described as holding unusual engagements with their fans, from their annual trips to Margate by coach where "fans, bands and booze collide for unscripted antics", and for taking "whole venues to the pub with them" after a show.

However this has been balanced with media commentary on the band's Cambridge educations, at a time when bands like Idles and Fontaines D.C. have pushed working class lyrics. Alex Rice notably drew criticism for declaring in The Guardian that HMLTD were “one of the worst bands ever” in part due to the fact their members "go to Goldsmiths". Clash stated in 2019 that "Sports Team can’t quite shake off their entitlement".

Discography

Studio albums

Extended plays

Singles

References

External links
 

2016 establishments in England
Bright Antenna Records artists
English alternative rock groups
English indie rock groups
English post-punk music groups
Island Records artists
Musical groups established in 2016
Sextets